The discography of Japanese musician Kahimi Karie consists of seven studio albums, five compilation albums, one remix album, six video albums, nine extended plays and nine singles.

Albums

Studio albums

Compilation albums

Remix albums

Video albums

Extended plays

Singles

Other appearances

References

External links
 
 
 Kahimi Karie at Victor Entertainment 

Discographies of Japanese artists
Pop music discographies